Coxsackie Correctional Facility is a maximum security state prison in Coxsackie, Greene County, New York. It currently houses approximately 900 inmates.  It is classified as a maximum security general confinement facility and detention center for men.

History 

The prison opened in 1935 as the New York State Vocational Institution, with buildings designed by Alfred Hopkins, an estate architect with a sideline in prisons such as Lewisburg Federal Penitentiary in Pennsylvania.  Hopkins had also designed Woodbourne Correctional Facility and Wallkill Correctional Facility for the state.  All three were designed on progressive principles, reflected a concern for aesthetics and a sense of places, and had no surrounding walls or fences.

The first inmates received at this institution, generally known as "Coxsackie", were older inmates from the New York House of Refuge which was being closed after serving as a juvenile reformatory since 1825. Coxsackie continued this reformatory function, providing inmates with a program of academic and vocational education. Industrial training is provided in mechanics, machine shop, printing, other trades, and agriculture. For the first ten years of its operation, Coxsackie received inmates by direct commitment from the courts. Since 1945, with the opening of the Elmira Reception Center, Coxsackie has received nearly all its inmates from this center.

References

External links 
  NY prison information

Prisons in New York (state)
Buildings and structures completed in 1935
Buildings and structures in Greene County, New York
1935 establishments in New York (state)